The 2007 CSIO Gijón was the 2007 edition of the Spanish official show jumping horse show, at Las Mestas Sports Complex in Gijón. It was held as CSIO 5*.

This edition of the CSIO Gijón was held between August 25 and September 2.

Nations Cup

The 2007 FEI Nations Cup of Spain was the fifth competition of the 2007 Samsung Super League and was held on Saturday, August 31, 2007.

The competition was a show jumping competition with two rounds. The height of the fences were up to 1.60 meters. The best six teams of the eleven which participated were allowed to start in the second round.

The competition was endowed with €60,900.

Grey penalties points do not count for the team result.

Gijón Grand Prix
The Gijón Grand Prix, the Show jumping Grand Prix of the 2007 CSIO Gijón, was the major show jumping competition at this event. It was held on 2 September 2007. The competition was a show jumping competition over two rounds, the height of the fences were up to 1.60 meters.

It was endowed with 135,000 €.

(Top 10 of 41 Competitors)

References

External links
Special website for the event at El Comercio
Official website

CSIO Gijón
2007 in show jumping